Ansar Ali (died 6 October 2020) was a Bangladesh Jamaat-e-Islami politician and a Jatiya Sangsad member representing the Satkhira-1 constituency.

Career
Ali was elected to parliament from Satkhira-1 as a Bangladesh Jamaat-e-Islami candidate in 1991.

References

2020 deaths
Bangladesh Jamaat-e-Islami politicians
5th Jatiya Sangsad members
Year of birth missing
Place of birth missing